Radford University is a public university in Radford, Virginia. It is one of the state's eight doctorate-granting public universities. Founded in 1910, Radford offers curricula for undergraduates in more than 100 fields, graduate programs including the M.F.A., M.B.A., M.A., M.S., Ed.S., Psy.D., M.S.W., and specialized doctoral programs in health-related professions. It is classified among "Doctoral/Professional Universities".

History
The State Normal and Industrial School for Women at Radford was founded in Radford as a women's college in 1910. In 1924, the school was renamed the State Teachers College at Radford, with the primary intent of training teachers in the Appalachian region. In 1943, as part of the state's consolidation movement, the college merged with the Virginia Polytechnic Institute in nearby Blacksburg, serving as the then predominately male land-grant college's women's campus. The merger dissolved in 1964 and Radford College became a coeducational institution in 1972. Following a period of sustained and significant growth, Radford College was granted university status in 1979. In 2008, the Virginia General Assembly authorized three doctoral programs at Radford University, and the first doctoral degrees were awarded in 2011.

Presidents
Radford University's current president is Bret S. Danilowicz who began his role on July 1, 2022. The university's administration is overseen by a 15-member board, whose members are appointed by the Governor of the Commonwealth and serve four-year terms. Each year, the Board also selects a student and a faculty member to serve as advisory representatives.

Past presidents:
 John Preston McConnell, 1911–1937
 David Wilbur Peters, 1938–1951
 Charles Knox Martin Jr., 1952–1972, Chancellor, 1972–73, President Emeritus
 Donald Newton Dedmon, 1972–1994
 Douglas Covington, 1995–2005, President Emeritus
 Penelope Ward Kyle, 2005–2016, President Emeritus
 Brian Hemphill, 2016-2021
Carolyn Ringer Lepre, (interim) 2021-2022
 Bret S. Danilowicz, 2022-present

Academics

Radford University's undergraduate programs emphasize the liberal arts, business, sciences, and teacher education. The graduate and undergraduate programs in business administration offered by the College of Business and Economics at Radford University are accredited by the Association to Advance Collegiate Schools of Business (AACSB).

The university has a student/faculty ratio of 14:1 with an average class size of 19.

More than 80 percent of faculty members hold doctorates or other terminal degrees (M.F.A., M.B.A., Ph.D., J.D., etc.) in their fields. Special programs include Study Abroad, Honors Academy, RU Connections freshmen living/learning communities, internships, co-ops, practical and service learning, Army ROTC, leading to commissions in the U.S. Army, and undergraduate research opportunities.

Radford University and Northern Virginia Community College signed a Guaranteed Transfer Partnership Agreement on August 28, 2017.

Undergraduate and graduate colleges
The university is organized into seven undergraduate colleges and school, and one graduate college:

 College of Humanities and Behavioral Sciences
 Davis College of Business and Economics
 College of Education and Human Development
 Waldron College of Health and Human Services
 Artis College of Science and Technology
 College of Visual and Performing Arts
 School of Nursing
 College of Graduate Studies and Research
The College of Graduate Studies and Research offers 18 degree programs in fields such as art, business, communication, counseling, criminal justice, education, English, music, nursing, occupational therapy, physical therapy, psychology, and social work. The State Council of Higher Education for Virginia has authorized three doctoral programs at Radford in counseling psychology, physical therapy and nursing practice. The Doctor of Psychology (Psy.D.) program in Counseling Psychology admitted its first students in the fall of 2008. The doctorate in physical therapy program began in the summer of 2009. The first Doctor of Nursing Practice students began studies in an online program in the fall of 2010.

Campus and community

Radford University is an  campus located in a residential area of Radford, Virginia. The town is located in the Virginia Highlands, between the Blue Ridge and Allegheny mountains at a double bend in the New River. Nearly all of the 31 administrative, academic, student services, and residence halls, many built in a red-brick Georgian style, are located on three quadrangles and a pedestrian thoroughfare in a  area, while a large adjoining area along the New River separated from the main campus by U.S. Route 11 and the Norfolk Southern railroad holds the university's athletic facilities, student parking lots, and student apartments. The university opened a new COBE building (College of Business and Economics) in 2012. In 2014 a New Student Fitness Center opened. A new Center for Sciences opened during the spring semester of 2016.  The following fall semester, the new CHBS (College of Humanities and Behavioral Sciences) Building opened its doors. As of 2016, nearly all dorms at Radford have been renovated. Renovations are currently ongoing for several buildings on campus. Radford is located on exits 105 and 109 of Interstate 81, with accessibility to nearby I-77.

Bordering the Little River, and about five miles from campus, is the Selu Conservancy, a  reserve, observatory, retreat, and conference center owned by the University Foundation.

Radford University is also home to the Radford University planetarium – a permanent planetarium with a 10-meter dome, running the Digistar 5 planetarium software. The planetarium is primarily operated by workstudy students, and is maintained by the physics department. All shows are free for all attendees.

Student life

Around 3,800 of Radford's students live on campus in 15 residence halls.

Radford University has more than 270 student clubs and organizations. Some of them are the Student Government Association, different academic fraternities, clubs, and societies in several academic fields, Radford Pitches A'capella, Yes & Improv Club, RU Outdoors, sports intramural clubs, Model United Nations Club, and more.

Radford University has a variety of student media organizations, such as The Tartan (student-run newspaper), Radio Free Radford, The Beehive (yearbook/magazine), Exit 109 (literary magazine), ROC-TV, a.k.a. "Radford On Camera" (student-TV-station), Whim (online magazine) and SMADS (student media advertising).

Radford has a variety of Greek life fraternities and sororities. More than 17 religious organizations are part of the Radford University Campus Ministers' Association (RUCMA). They hold religious events, masses, and ceremonies throughout the academic year.

Athletics

The university's teams are known as the Highlanders (in honor of the region's Scots-Irish heritage) and compete in the Big South Conference. Radford offers 16 NCAA varsity sports for men and women. The Radford men's basketball team won the Big South Conference tournament in 1998, 2009, and 2018. Radford also won the Big South Conference Men's Tennis Championship in 2007, 2008, and 2009 as well as the Big South Softball Championship in 2009.

The Radford Baseball Team has won the Big South Conference Championship in 2015, and 2017. In 2015, they defeated the Chanticleers of Coastal Carolina with a walk-off single by Hunter Higgerson. The team finished with a final record of 45–16. The team was selected to compete in the Nashville Regional where they went 2–2, with wins against Lipscomb University and Indiana University, before losing to the 2015 National Runner-up Vanderbilt University, in the Regional Finals.

The Radford men's Rugby club team won the Division II National Championship in 2003 and 2008.

Student athletes have exclusive use of the Dedmon Center, a recreational and convocation complex that opened in 1981. The Dedmon Center features a 1/6-mile indoor jogging track, a weight-training room, locker rooms, and several team rooms. The main arena features a basketball floor and a secondary volleyball arena for intercollegiate competition with four recreational courts for basketball or volleyball. Adjoining facilities include intramural soccer, football, softball fields, and intercollegiate fields and courts for baseball, softball, field hockey, and tennis. The Patrick D. Cupp Stadium adds an intercollegiate soccer, lacrosse, and track and field complex.

Notable alumni
 Belinda C. Anderson – 11th president of Virginia Union University
 Frank Beamer – Former head coach of Virginia Tech's football program.
 Eddie Butler – Former MLB player with the Colorado Rockies, Chicago Cubs, and the Texas Rangers.
 Kiera Cass – Author
 Javonte Green - NBA Player for the Chicago Bulls
 Randal J. Kirk – Founder of New River Pharmaceuticals and CEO of Intrexon
 Scott Long – Human rights activist focusing on LGBT people at Human Rights Watch. Visiting Fellow in the Human Rights Program of Harvard Law School 2011–2012.
 Marylynn Magar – Florida House of Representatives
 Nick Mayhugh - Track & Field Gold Medalist at the 2020 Summer Paralympics
 Jayma Mays – American actress and singer
 Ryan Meisinger - Current MLB player for the St. Louis Cardinals
Artsiom Parakhouski (born 1987) - Belarusian basketball player
 Politicks – Rock band
 Steve Robinson – University of North Carolina at Chapel Hill Assistant Head Coach
 Marty Smith – ESPN Commentator and host of Marty Smith's America
 Joseph Yost – Virginia House of Delegates

References

External links

 
 Radford Athletics website

 
Education in Radford, Virginia
Educational institutions established in 1910
Former women's universities and colleges in the United States
Public universities and colleges in Virginia
Universities and colleges accredited by the Southern Association of Colleges and Schools
Buildings and structures in Radford, Virginia
1910 establishments in Virginia